Christianity is the dominant religion in Belize. The single largest denomination is the Roman Catholic Church with about 40.1% of the population (129,456 adherents), a reduction from 49.6% of the population in 2000, 57.7% in 1991 and 61.9% in 1980, although absolute numbers have still risen. 
Other major groups include Pentecostal with 8.4% of the population up from 7.4% in 2000 and 6.3% in 1991, Seventh-day Adventists with 5.4% of the population up from 5.2% in 2000 and 4.1% in 1991.  The following of the Anglican Church has been steadily declining, with only 4.7% of the population in 2010 compared to 6.95% in 1991.  About 12,000  Mennonites (3.7% of the population) live mostly in the rural districts of Cayo and Orange Walk.   People who declared they belong to no religion make up 15.5% of the population (just under 50,000 people) in 2010, more than double their 2000 census numbers. 11.2% adhere to other religions which include the Maya religion, Afro-American religions (Garifuna religion, Obeah and Myalism), Mormons, Hindus, Buddhists, Muslims, Baháʼís, Rastafarians and others.

There were 1,333 Mormons in 2010 though the Church of Jesus Christ of Latter-day Saints claims 4,807 members as of 2015 (in 11 congregations).

The 2010 census also found  216 followers of the Baháʼí Faith (down slightly from the 2000 census, which counted 219).  It also found small numbers of Buddhists (820 or 0.3% of the population), Hindus (about 650), and Muslims (about 620).
However, the Association of Religion Data Archives states that as of 2005, 2.5% of the population identifies as Baháʼí, 2.0% identifies as Hindu, 1.1% identifies as Jewish, 1.0% identifies as spiritists, 0.6% identifies as followers of indigenous religions, 0.5% identifies as Muslim, and 0.5% identifies as Buddhist. They estimate there were 7,776 Baháʼís in Belize in that year, as well as the highest proportion of Baháʼís in any country (though not nearly the highest absolute number).  The 2010 Belize Population Census, however, recorded only 202 Baháʼís out of a total population of 304,106, yielding a proportion of 0.066%, far less than 2.5%.

Belizean Roman Catholic churches belong to the Diocese of Belize City-Belmopan; Anglican churches belong to the Diocese of Belize, part of the Church in the Province of the West Indies. Catholics frequently visit the country for special gospel revivals. The Greek Orthodox Church has a presence in Santa Elena. Muslims have been in Belize since the 18th century. Activism of the 1960s saw many converts to Islam. It is also common among Middle Eastern immigrants and has gained a following among some Kriols. Mosques continue to be built in major cities. Ahmadiyya Muslim Jama’at in Belize City built Masjid Noor Mosque at the beginning of 2020. It remains one of the fastest growing sect of Islam in Belize.   Hinduism is followed by most Indian immigrants.

Religious freedom 
The constitution of Belize establishes the freedom of religion. Discrimination on religious grounds is illegal. A law against blasphemy is unenforced. The Council of Churches, a body which includes representatives from several Christian denominations, appoints one senator to the senate of Belize with the approval of the Governor-General. The law also establishes that prisoners in jails must have their religious beliefs respected and accommodated.

Religious groups are required to register with the government in order to operate in the country. Religious groups are exempt from certain taxes. Missionaries are required to register with the government and purchase a religious worker's permit.

The public school curriculum for primary schools includes nondenominational "spirituality" classes that introduce world religions, as well as ethics and morals associated with religion. Most public schools are managed by Christian churches. A few schools are run by non-Christian religious groups.

Census results

See also
 Hinduism in Belize
 History of the Catholic Church in Belize
 Islam in Belize
 List of churches in Belize
 Mennonites in Belize
 Roman Catholicism in Belize

References